Marine angelfish are perciform fish of the family Pomacanthidae. They are found on shallow reefs in the tropical Atlantic, Indian, and mostly western Pacific Oceans.  The family contains seven genera and about 86 species. They should not be confused with the freshwater angelfish, tropical cichlids of the Amazon Basin.

Description

With their bright colours and deep, laterally compressed bodies, marine angelfishes are some of the more conspicuous residents of the reef. They most closely resemble the butterflyfishes, a related family of similarly showy reef fish. Marine angelfish are distinguished from butterflyfish by the presence of strong preopercle spines (part of the gill covers) in the former. This feature also explains the family name Pomacanthidae; from the Greek πομα, poma meaning "cover" and ακάνθα, akantha meaning "thorn".

Many species of marine angelfishes have streamer-like extensions of the soft dorsal and anal fins. The fish have small mouths, relatively large pectoral fins, and rounded to lunate tail fins. The smaller species are popular amongst aquarists, whereas the largest species are occasionally sought as a food fish; however,  ciguatera poisoning has been reported as a result of eating marine angelfish.

Angelfish vary in color and are very hardy fish. When kept in aquariums they can easily adapt to pH and hardness changes in water and can handle conditions that are not considered to be perfect. They are usually a long-living species and are easy to care for. They were very expensive in the aquarium trade when first discovered, but have become more popular and therefore less pricey.

The queen angelfish grows to be . With neon blue and yellow scales and iridescent purple and orange markings, surprisingly it is not conspicuous, and actually hides very well, and is very shy.

As juveniles, some species are different colors than when they reach adulthood. For example, the Blue Angelfish is a vibrant, electric blue color with black and white stripes or spots. When they reach adulthood, they turn a grayish color with yellow and blue fins and dark spots on their bodies.

Behavior
The larger species are also quite bold and seemingly fearless; they are known to approach divers. While the majority adapts easily to captive life, some are specialist feeders which are difficult to maintain. Feeding habits can be strictly defined through genus, with Genicanthus species feeding on zooplankton and Centropyge preferring filamentous algae. Other species focus on sessile benthic invertebrates; sponges, tunicates, bryozoans, and hydroids are staples. On Caribbean coral reefs, angelfishes primarily eat sponges, and have an important role in preventing the overgrowth of reef-building corals by eating faster-growing sponge species.

They are diurnal animals, hiding amongst the nooks and crevices of the reef by night. Some species are solitary in nature and form highly territorial mated pairs; others form harems with a single male dominant over several females. As juveniles, some species may eke out a living as cleaner fish.

Reproduction
Common to many species is a dramatic shift in coloration associated with maturity. For example, young male ornate angelfish, Genicanthus bellus, have broad, black bands and are indistinguishable from females; as they mature, bright orange bands develop on the flanks and back.  Thought to correspond to social rank, these colour shifts are not necessarily confined to males; all marine angelfish species are known to be protogynous hermaphrodites. This means that if the dominant male of a harem is removed, a female will turn into a functional male.

As pelagic spawners, marine angelfishes release many tiny buoyant eggs into the water which then become part of the plankton. The eggs float freely with the currents until hatching, with a high number falling victim to planktonic feeders.

In aquariums, two fish usually will breed within their community but will harass other fish in the tank, so it is best they have their own with plenty of room.

Characteristics 

 Two-spined angelfish, (Centropage bispinosa) also known as the "coral beauty" or "dusky angelfish" has a vibrant blue or darkish purple body with a reddish-yellow underside that is usually covered in stripes.
 These stripes vary from purple, red and orange, and may even appear as spots.
 It is highly demanded in the tropical aquarium trade, but is at low risk on the IUCN Red List of Threatened Species.
 The Coral Beauty Angelfish is native to the Indo-Pacific Ocean, usually found in shallow reefy waters or sometimes in deep waters.
 They feed on algae and hide in coral reefs and lagoons in the wild.
 The Two-spined angelfish usually reaches up to 3 inches and have a rounded caudal fin.
 In aquarium life they nibble on corals and rocks and are considered to be starter fish. They have a high metabolism so feeding only needs to occur every other day.

 The blue angelfish, (Pomacanthus semicirculatus) is a vibrant, electric blue color with black and white stripes and sometimes spots as a juvenile. It turns a grayish color with dark spots and sometimes yellow and blue accents as an adult.
 Found in stony and soft corals and are more likely to be found in vibrantly colored corals as juveniles.
 Dorsal and pelvic fin help with speed.
 Tend to hide from predators in dark areas.
 Vibrant electric blue color allows them to pose as toxic to predators. 
 There are 13 different species in the Pomacanthus genus.
 Rarely travel in schools and can grow up to 40 cm.
 Can live up to 25+ years. 

 Usually non-aggressive but can become territorial in full or smaller tanks. It is not recommended that they share a tank with sessile invertebrates or stony corals with polyps because they tend to bite at corals and hard rocks or shells. They have a high metabolism so feeding only needs to occur every other day. They are omnivores who feed on algae and meat. They need a tank with many suitable hiding places and water at a temperature of at least 80 °F.

 Marine angelfish were introduced to the United States sometime in 1917. They were then a rare fish, and therefore highly desired. People would pay high prices for these fish, especially a mating pair which was worth someone's salary for an entire week. Breeding was not successful at first, but breeders and hobbyists eventually became more advanced at the process and were able to successfully breed them in small numbers, mostly in the silvery colors. In the 1980s, commercial fish farming had become much more popular and fish farms in Florida were breeding different colors, species and sizes of angelfish. When The Black Plague hit in 1989, it caused a shut down of commercial fish farms, resulting in these fish being unavailable for a few years. These fish are now highly popular in the aquarium trade and a variety of species can be found all around the world in tanks or natural waters.

Taxonomy

The Pomacanthidae is frequently placed within the large order Perciformes but taxonomists have also placed the family within the order Acanthuriformes, alongside the Chaetodontidae and Acanthuridae, among others. Other authorities have resolved the family as incertae sedis.

There are 88 species in eight genera:

Timeline

References

Further reading

External links
 Skaphandrus.com Pomacanthidae photos

 
Perciformes families
Marine fish families
Taxa named by David Starr Jordan